The 1998–99 Tampa Bay Lightning season was the franchise's seventh season of operation in the National Hockey League (NHL). For the third consecutive year, the Lighting were unable to qualify for the playoffs. They also finished in last place for the second consecutive year as well.

Offseason

Regular season

The Lightning again finished last in scoring, with just 179 goals for. They also allowed the most goals of all 27 teams, with 292 goals against.

All-Star Game

The 49th National Hockey League All-Star Game took place on January 24, 1999, at the Ice Palace in Tampa Bay, Florida, home to the Tampa Bay Lightning. It would be Wayne Gretzky's last All-Star Game.

Season standings

Game log

Player stats

Regular season
Scoring

Goaltending

Draft picks
Tampa Bay's draft picks at the 1998 NHL Entry Draft held at the Marine Midland Arena in Buffalo, New York.

References
Bibliography
 
LightningHockey Database

Tampa Bay Lightning seasons
T
T
National Hockey League All-Star Game hosts
Tamp
Tamp